Chota Imambara, also known as Imambara Hussainabad Mubarak is an imposing monument located in the city of Lucknow, Uttar Pradesh, India.  It took 54 years to finalize it. Built as an imambara or a congregation hall for Shia Muslims, by Muhammad Ali Shah, the Nawab of Awadh in 1838, it was to serve as a mausoleum for himself and his mother, who is buried beside him.

The significance of Panjetan, the holy five, is once again emphasized here with five main doorways. This Imambara consist of two halls and a Shehnasheen (a platform where the Zarih of Imam Husain is kept.) Zarih is the replica of that protective grill or structure which is kept on the grave of Imam Husain at Karbala, Iraq. The large green and white bordered hall of Azakhana is richly decorated with chandeliers and a good number of crystal glass lamp-stands. In fact, it was for this profuse decoration that the Imambara was referred by European visitors and writers as The Palace of Lights. The exterior is very beautifully decorated with Quranic verses in Islamic calligraphy .

Overview

It is situated near the Bara Imambara and on the connecting road stands an imposing gateway known as Rumi Darwaza. The building is also known as the Palace of Lights because of its decorations and chandeliers during special festivals, like Muharram.

The chandeliers used to decorate the interior of this building were brought from Belgium. Also housed within the building, is the crown of Muhammad Ali Shah and ceremonial tazias.  Thousands of labourers worked on the project to gain famine relief.

It has a gilded dome and several turrets and minarets. The tombs of Muhammad Ali Shah and other members of his family are inside the imambara. This includes two replicas of the Taj Mahal, built as the tombs of Muhammad Ali Shah's daughter and her husband. The walls are decorated with Arabic calligraphy.

Water supply for the fountains and the water bodies inside the imambara came directly from the Gomti River.

Tomb of Princess Asiya Begum, daughter of King Mohammad Ali Shah Bahadur (3rd King of Awadh) 

This structure serves as a mausoleum for the grave of Nawab Janab Asiya Begum Sahiba, daughter of the King Mohammed Ali Shah and two other graves. This is a small-scale copy of the Taj Mahal.

Treasury 
This other structure facing the tomb was built for the architectural symmetry and balance of the Imambara. It was used as a treasury.

Husainabad Mosque 
This mosque is built on a high platform with two grand minarets on the edge of the platform. This mosque is very beautifully decorated with floral designs and Quranic calligraphy.

Satkhanda

Outside the imambara is the watch tower called Satkhanda or tower of seven stories. Though it is called Satkhanda, it has only four stories, as the construction of the tower was abandoned when Ali Shah died. Satkhanda was built between 1837–1842 in the time of Muhammad Ali Shah. He wanted to make it the same as Qutub Minar of Delhi and the leaning tower of Pisa. Its main purpose is lunar observation.

Improper restoration 
The building has been renovated; however, the process has been criticized. In 2016 The Economist wrote that "[this building]  was recently “repaired” with modern cement, wrecking its subtle plasterwork".

Gallery

See also

Chattar Manzil
Imambara Shah Najaf
 Hussainia
Imambaras of Lucknow
 Azadari in Lucknow
Buland Darwaza

References

Imambaras of Lucknow
Indo-Islamic architecture
Buildings and structures completed in 1838
Mausoleums in Uttar Pradesh
Shia shrines
Awadh
History of Lucknow
1838 establishments in India